The men's 50 kilometres race walk at the 2004 Summer Olympics as part of the athletics program was held through the streets of Athens with the start and finish at the Athens Olympic Stadium on August 27.

The race had started in the virtually empty Olympic Stadium with fifty-four walkers lining up the field. The Chinese trio of Han Yucheng, Yu Chaohong, and Alatan Gadasu hurtled away from the pack to take the front as they left the stadium. In the early laps, Han made a tactical move to continuously lead the Chinese walkers within five minutes, but he received his first of three warnings, fell off back to the pack, and was later disqualified after the red paddle. Ten minutes into the race, the Chinese duo were soon joined by four other walkers, Russia's world record holder Denis Nizhegorodov and his teammate Aleksey Voyevodin, 20 km bronze medalist Nathan Deakes of Australia, and defending Olympic champion Robert Korzeniowski.

Between 10 and 30k, Nizhegorodov and Korzeniowski moved to the front of the pack and stayed abreast each other through most of the race. At the halfway point, the leading group had been whittled down to four. Korzeniowski was still in the lead with the Russian duo and Deakes attempting to overtake him. While Nizhegorodov and Voyevodin created a gap as they separated from the group to gain a thirty second advantage, it came down to a chase between Korzeniowski and Deakes to take the lead with only one hour to go. Deakes was eventually disqualified after his third warning with the red card, and Korzeniowski steadily broke away from the field to own the remaining third of the race.

At around 35k, Korzeniowski had commanded a 30 second lead over the weary Nizhegorodov and a further 22 seconds over Yu Chaohong. Walking tirelessly in fourth, Voyevodin managed to bridge back to the pack and launched a charge to strengthen his pace closely behind Yu.

Coming through the 45k mark and into the Olympic Stadium, Korzeniowski increased his lead by fifteen seconds ahead of the world record holder before storming his way at the final turn to cross the finish line for the last time in his competitive career. With a historic win, he added a fourth gold medal to his Olympic tally in 3:38:46.

Five minutes behind Korzeniowski, Nizhegorodov appeared unstable on the home stretch, but had accumulated much ground to finish strong with a silver medal, before collapsing to the track in exhaustion. Meanwhile, his fast-charging teammate Voyevodin surpassed the confident Yu just outside the stadium to claim the bronze with a tremendous finish, edging the Chinese off the podium by eleven seconds.

Records
, the existing World and Olympic records were as follows.

No new records were set during the competition.

Qualification
The qualification period for athletics was 1 January 2003 to 9 August 2004. For the men's 20 kilometres race walk, each National Olympic Committee was permitted to enter up to three athletes that had run the race in 4:00:00 or faster during the qualification period. If an NOC had no athletes that qualified under that standard, one athlete that had run the race in 4:07:00 or faster could be entered.

Schedule
All times are Greece Standard Time (UTC+2)

Results

References

External links
 IAAF Athens 2004 Olympic Coverage

M
Racewalking at the Olympics
Men's events at the 2004 Summer Olympics